"19" is a song by British musician Paul Hardcastle, released as the first single from his self-titled fourth studio album Paul Hardcastle (1985).

The song has a strong anti-war message, focusing on the United States' involvement in the Vietnam War and the effect it had on the soldiers who served. The track was notable for early use of sampled and processed speech, in particular a synthesized stutter effect used on the words "nineteen" and "destruction". It also includes various non-speech, re-dubbed sampling, such as crowd noise and a military bugle call.

"19" features sampled narration (voiced by Peter Thomas), out-of-context interview dialogue ("I wasn't really sure what was going on") and news reports from Vietnam Requiem the ABC television documentary about the post-traumatic stress disorder suffered by Vietnam veterans. In 2009, the song placed at 73 on VH1's 100 Greatest One-Hit Wonders of the 80s.

"19" had huge international success in the charts; it went to No. 1 in the UK for five weeks, as well as a number of other countries worldwide. "19" became the top-selling single in 13 countries for 1985. This was helped by international versions of the song spoken by well-known local news anchors in French, Spanish, German and Japanese. The song received the Ivor Novello Award for Best-selling single of 1985. The song's English-language release came in three different 12" versions: "Extended Version", "Destruction Mix" and "The Final Story", all with an alternative cover design.

Background and content
Hardcastle was inspired to create the song after watching Vietnam Requiem, and comparing his own life at 19 to those of the soldiers featured: "...what struck me was how young the soldiers were: the documentary said their average age was 19. I was out having fun in pubs and clubs when I was 19, not being shoved into jungles and shot at."

The title "19" comes from the documentary's narrative that the average age of an American combat soldier in the war was 19, as compared to 26 in World War II. This claim has since been disputed. Undisputed statistics do not exist, although Southeast Asia Combat Area Casualties Current File (CACCF), the source for the Vietnam Veterans Memorial, shows a large number of deaths (38%) were ages 19 or 20. According to the same source, 23 is the average age at time of death (or time of declaration of death). The song also comments that while the tour of duty was longer during World War II, soldiers in Vietnam were subjected to hostile fire more frequently: "almost every day".

Musically, the song was inspired by electro, particularly Afrika Bambaataa, although Hardcastle also "added a bit of jazz and a nice melody", and beyond the sampling of the documentary narration, the song incorporated pieces of interviews with soldiers. The song's pivotal hook, the repetitive "N-n-n-n-nineteen", was chosen due to the limitations of the early sampling technology used. The E-mu Emulator could only sample for two seconds, so the hook was based around "the only bit of the narrative that made sense in two seconds". Hardcastle was not optimistic about the song's chances in the charts. His previous two singles for independent labels had failed to make it into the UK's top 40 and the musical policy at Radio 1 was felt to be unsupportive of dance music. News interest in the song helped, with the tenth anniversary of the end of the Vietnam War seeing Hardcastle interviewed by Alastair Stewart of ITN.

Tony Blackburn, then breakfast DJ for Radio London was an early supporter of the song and it quickly reached number 1 in the UK and most of the world. Hardcastle produced different mixes of the song to help maintain interest in it. Although the song only reached number 15 in the United States chart, Hardcastle claims "it outsold everybody else for three weeks solid, it only reached number 15, because back then the chart was based on airplay as well as sales". The song was held back in the US by some radio stations refusing to play it, feeling that the song took an anti-American stance, something Hardcastle denies, noting he "had tons of letters from Vietnam vets thanking me for doing something for them".

The song's reliance on sampling also caused problems with legal clearance. Ken Grunbaum recalled in 2012 that "there were no precedents for something like this. We ended up having to pay royalties to the narrator, Peter Thomas."

19 PTSD
In 2015, Hardcastle released a charity version of the song for the Talking2Minds organisation, who raise money for troops suffering from Post Traumatic Stress Disorder. This PTSD remix was also found on 19: The 30th Anniversary Collection, a compilation album which included 14 versions of the song such as the Cryogenic Freeze Remix and a version which included samples of Marvin Gaye.

Music video
After the song's unexpected, rapid climb to the top of the UK Singles Chart, Chrysalis asked Vietnam Requiem directors Jonas McCord and Bill Couturié to rush a video into production. Due to the lack of a band able to perform the song, the video was primarily composed of clips from the Vietnam Requiem documentary, edited together by Ken Grunbaum. The first version of the video included footage from the television networks NBC and ABC, including a newscast by ABC anchorman Frank Reynolds. After it was aired on MTV in the US, NBC and ABC objected to the "bad taste" of using the serious clips in a "trivial" form of "propaganda". McCord and Couterié were forced to produce a new cut incorporating public domain footage, but ABC permitted Reynolds' audio to remain. Couterié asserted at the time that the television networks opposed the video because it involved rock music:

Charts and certifications

Weekly charts

Year-end charts

Certifications and sales

Parody
In the same year of release, comedian Rory Bremner, using the band name The Commentators, released a parodied version of the song as "N-N-Nineteen Not Out", about the England cricket team's poor performance in test matches, with references to the team's disastrous 1984 home series against the West Indies in which captain David Gower had averaged 19.

Other uses in popular culture
Manchester United used the "19" soundtrack to celebrate their 19th Premier League title in May 2011, and the song made a reappearance in the UK Top 40.

See also

List of anti-war songs
Lists of number-one singles (Austria)
List of Dutch Top 40 number-one singles of 1985
List of number-one hits of 1985 (Germany)
List of number-one singles of 1985 (Ireland)
List of number-one hits of 1985 (Italy)
List of number-one singles from the 1980s (New Zealand)
List of number-one songs in Norway
List of number-one singles and albums in Sweden
List of number-one singles of the 1980s (Switzerland)
List of UK Singles Chart number ones of the 1980s
List of number-one dance singles of 1985 (U.S.)

References

Songs about teenagers
1985 singles
1985 songs
Paul Hardcastle songs
Anti-war songs
Dutch Top 40 number-one singles
European Hot 100 Singles number-one singles
Irish Singles Chart number-one singles
Music video controversies
Number-one singles in Austria
Number-one singles in Germany
Number-one singles in Italy
Number-one singles in New Zealand
Number-one singles in Norway
Number-one singles in Sweden
Number-one singles in Switzerland
Song recordings produced by Paul Hardcastle
Protest songs
Songs of the Vietnam War
UK Singles Chart number-one singles
Ultratop 50 Singles (Flanders) number-one singles
Chrysalis Records singles
Post-traumatic stress disorder